Ágota Bozai is a Hungarian writer. She was born in Siófok, Hungary in 1965. She holds an MA degree in philology from the University of Kolozsvár i.e. Cluj-Napoca. She is currently a literary translator of English books (fiction and non-fiction) for various Hungarian publishers.
Her writing has been described as a "satirical account of what happened in the east European Countries when ‘at-all-costs capitalism’ sprung up from the ashes of the previously Soviet-controlled governments."
Her novels include Persian Divan and To Err is Divine, Mi az ábra? (What's Up? 2003) and A szerelmetlen város (A Loveless Little Town, 2004). She has recently been writing her PhD thesis in English Literature and teaches Creative Writing at ELTE (Eötvös Loránd University), Budapest.

Sources 
 Review
 Bozai Ágota

1965 births
Living people
Hungarian women writers
Hungarian translators
Hungarian expatriates in Romania
People from Siófok